Super Sketch  is a 2018 Indian Telugu-language investigative suspense thriller film written and directed by Ravi Chavali and produced by Balaram Makkala and Padmanabha Reddy. It features Narsingh, Indra, Sameer Datta, Sophia and Gary Tony in the lead roles, the latter two being English actors. The film is based on the concept of mind games. The film was released on 29 June 2018.

Cast
 Narsing as Nayak
 Indrasena as Vashikaran
 Sameer Datta as Tony
 Shubhangi Pant as Pragna
 Gary Tony as Steven
 Sophiya as Stella
 Karthik Reddy as Saketh
 Chakra Maganti as Kamaraju
 Anika Rao as Nayak's girlfriend 
 Sohel as Ashrith
 Muktevi Prakasa Rao as Lawyer

Production

Development
After making numerous films, Ravi Chavali made his very low budget directorial Experiment investigative suspense thriller genre with all new actors.

Casting
Narsing who earlier worked in Ravi Chavali's films was selected as protagonist while Indrasena who portrayed a lead role in Putrudu (2009) as antagonist with this film.

Filming
Ravi Chavali shot the entire film within 20 days.

Soundtrack
This film has four songs composed by Karthik Kodakandla and lyrics are written by Subhash Narayan Injapuri, Nikhita Pathapati and Lakshmi Priyanka. Music released on Aditya Music.

References

External links
 

2018 films
2010s Telugu-language films
Films shot in Telangana
Indian thriller films
2018 thriller films
Films directed by Ravi Chavali